Anikovskaya is a rural locality (a village) in Ustretskoye Rural Settlement, Syamzhensky District, Vologda Oblast, Russia. The population was 12 as of 2002.

Geography 
Anikovskaya is located 24 km west of Syamzha (the district's administrative centre) by road. Frolikha is the nearest rural locality.

References 

Rural localities in Syamzhensky District